Hucisko Jawornickie  (Hutys’ko Yavirnyts’ke) is a village in the administrative district of Gmina Jawornik Polski, within Przeworsk County, Subcarpathian Voivodeship, in south-eastern Poland.

Gallery

References

Hucisko Jawornickie